The Men's individual pursuit was held on 21 October 2017.

Results

Qualifying
The fastest 4 competitors qualify for the medal finals.

Finals
The final classification is determined in the medal finals.

References

Men's individual pursuit
European Track Championships – Men's individual pursuit